The treble-bar or St. John's wort inchworm (Aplocera plagiata) is a moth of the family Geometridae. the species was first described by Carl Linnaeus in his 1758 10th edition of Systema Naturae. It is found throughout the Palearctic region and the Near East. 

This species varies considerably in size (wingspan 37–43 mm) and colouration but is generally grey with three characteristic dark fascia across each forewing, giving it its common name. The hindwings are pale grey or buff. Many forma have been described. See Prout (1912–16) Aplocera plagiata is difficult to certainly distinguish from its congener Aplocera efformata See Townsend et al.

One or two broods are produced each year. In the British Isles, the adults can be seen at any time from May to September. The species flies at night and is attracted to light.
The egg is whitish, without gloss, micropylar rosette 11- to 12-leaved, the sides with regular polygonal reticulation, each cell again more irregularly subdivided.
The larva is also very variable, being green to reddish brown with alternating darker and lighter stripes. It feeds on various species of St John's wort (Hypericum species). It overwinters as a small larva.

Subspecies 
Aplocera plagiata hausmanni
Aplocera plagiata plagiata

References 

Chinery, Michael Collins Guide to the Insects of Britain and Western Europe 1986 (Reprinted 1991)
Skinner, Bernard Colour Identification Guide to Moths of the British Isles 1984

External links 

Treble-bar at UKMoths
Fauna Europaea
Lepiforum e.V.

Aplocera
Moths described in 1758
Moths of Europe
Moths of Asia
Taxa named by Carl Linnaeus